XHHW-FM/XEHW-AM is a radio station on 102.7 FM in Mazatlán, Sinaloa. It is owned by Radiosistema del Noroeste and carries the La Mejor grupera format from MVS Radio.

History
XEHW-AM 1440 in Rosario, Sinaloa received its concession on April 5, 1957. The 250-watt station was owned by Luis Pandoja Parra. In the 1990s, XEHW moved its primary transmitter to Chametla and raised power to 5 kW day and 1 kW night.

In 2011, XEHW was authorized to move to FM as XHHW-FM 101.9. In 2013, XHHW was authorized to move to 102.7 FM from a transmitter in Rosario and raise its effective radiated power from 25,000 to 50,000 watts—higher than almost all other AM-FM migrants, as migrating stations were initially only allowed 25 kW ERP. The AM station moved at the same time and decreased its nighttime power to 800 watts.

References

Radio stations in Sinaloa
Radio stations in Mexico with continuity obligations